The XVIII Island Games (officially the 2019 NatWest Island Games) was held in the British Overseas Territory of Gibraltar between 6 and 12 July 2019. This was the second time that the territory has hosted the games, the first being in 1995.

The games did not include archery, cycling, football, or volleyball, which had been in all previous games since 1985, due to the lack of venues. They were replaced by tenpin bowling, judo, and squash. Gibraltar's sports facilities were greatly redeveloped throughout 2018. Cycling was subsequently included on the list of events on the Games official website, while the 2019 Inter Games Football Tournament was announced as a substitute for the lack of football.

Host
The Faroe Islands were initially scheduled to stage the 2019 games, with the 2021 games taking place in Menorca, but in 2014 the hosts were swapped following issues with the Faroese facilities being ready in time. Menorca then withdrew from hosting the 2019 games in July 2015 following a change in government. After the Isle of Man and 2015 hosts Jersey confirmed that they would not apply as replacements, Gibraltar announced in August their intention to host the games, and were officially announced as hosts in April 2016.

On 2 May 2018 it was announced that Ynys Môn would hold an unofficial football tournament to replace the absence of football in the Island Games. Islands that are regulars to the Games were expected to attend.

Participating islands
22 island entities of the IIGA, from Europe, South Atlantic and the Caribbean area, competed in these Games. Both Rhodes and Frøya did not participate in this edition.

 (Host)

Sports
Numbers in parentheses indicate the number of medal events contested in each sport.

Venues

Medal table

References

External links
Island Games 2019

 
Island Games
Island Games
2019 in Gibraltarian sport
International sports competitions hosted by Gibraltar
Island Games